Dasht-e Zar (also Romanized as Dasht-e Zār) is a village in Poshtkuh Rural District, in the Central District of Khash County, Sistan and Baluchestan Province, Iran. At the 2006 census, its population was 44, in 7 families.

References 

Populated places in Khash County